John Wesley Sawyer (born July 26, 1953) is a former professional American football tight end in the National Football League for the Houston Oilers, Seattle Seahawks, Washington Redskins, and the Denver Broncos.  He played college football at The University of Southern Mississippi and was drafted in the eleventh round of the 1975 NFL Draft.

References

American football tight ends
Southern Miss Golden Eagles football players
Houston Oilers players
Seattle Seahawks players
Washington Redskins players
Denver Broncos players
1953 births
Living people